Maurice "Max" Tobias (1885 – after 1953) was a Belgian professional footballer who played as a midfielder.

Honours

Club 
Union Saint-Gilloise
First Division (5): 1903–04, 1904–05, 1905–06, 1906–07, 1908–09

External links 
Max Tobias at MagliaRossonera.it 

1880s births
A.C. Milan players
Association football midfielders
Belgian expatriate footballers
Belgian expatriate sportspeople in Italy
Belgian footballers
Belgium international footballers
K.A.A. Gent players
K.V. Mechelen players
Royale Union Saint-Gilloise players
Year of death missing
K.F.C. Rhodienne-De Hoek players